Ali Asghar Khan may refer to:

 Mirza Ali Asghar Khan Amin al-Sultan (1843–1907), last prime minister of Iran under Nasser al-Din Shah Qajar
 Ali Asghar (died c. 1743), one of the prominent Emir and nobleman during the Mughal empire